Maria Chwalibóg (born 4 February 1933) is a Polish actress. She appeared in more than thirty films since 1956.

Selected filmography

References

External links
 

1933 births
Living people
Actresses from Warsaw
Polish film actresses